Kornegay is an unincorporated community in Duplin County, North Carolina, United States.

It is the location of B.F. Grady School, designed by architect Leslie Boney, Sr., which is listed on the U.S. National Register of Historic Places.

References

Unincorporated communities in Duplin County, North Carolina
Unincorporated communities in North Carolina